Nikli is an upazila of Kishoreganj District in the Division of Dhaka, Bangladesh.

Geography

It has 22,008 households and total area 214.4 km2.

Demographics
As of the 1991 Bangladesh census, Nikli has a population of 110,912. Males constitute 50.16% of the population, and females 49.84%. This Upazila's eighteen up population is 54,437. Nikli has an average literacy rate of 12.6% (7+ years), and the national average of 32.4% literate.

Administration
Nikli Upazila is divided into seven union parishads: Chatir Char, Dampara, Gurai, Jaraitala, Karpasha, Nikli, and Singpur. The union parishads are subdivided into 46 mauzas and 125 villages.

See also
Upazilas of Bangladesh
Districts of Bangladesh
Divisions of Bangladesh

References

Upazilas of Kishoreganj District